Keluo (Chinese: , p Kēluò) is a dormant volcanic field  north-by-northwest of Daquijin in northeastern China. It is located at an intersection of regional lineaments trending northeast and northwest; the volcanoes were erupted through basement igneous and sedimentary rocks from the Jurassic to Cretaceous, through granite, and through pre-Permian metasediments. Like the Wudalianchi volcanic to its south, it contains high-potassium basaltic cinder cones.

There are reports of historical activity, but these remain unconfirmed. The morphology of a number of the conesincluding Nanshan, Gushan, Jianshan, Dayishan, and Xiaoyishansuggests their formation during the last 10,000 years (the Holocene). Most cones to the northeast, however, probably date from the Pleistocene to the Tertiary.

Other peaks include Dangzishan, Heishan, and Muhenanshan.

See also
 List of volcanoes in China

References

External links

Dormant volcanoes
Volcanoes of China
Volcanic fields